Lidhorakhas is a town and a Tehsil in Tikamgarh district in the Indian state of Madhya Pradesh.

Demographics

As of the 2011 Census of India, Lidhorakhas had a population of 12,974. Males constitute 52% of the population and females 48%. Lidhorakhas has an average literacy rate of 48%, lower than the national average of 59.5%: male literacy is 60%, and female literacy is 35%. In Lidhorakhas, 20% of the population is under 6 years of age.

References

Cities and towns in Tikamgarh district